Falls City Public Schools is a school district headquartered in Falls City, Nebraska.

Within Richardson County, in addition to Falls City, the district includes Preston, Rulo, Salem, and Verdon, as well as portions of Barada. The district extends into sections of Nemaha County.

History
In 2004 the district absorbed portions of the former Dawson-Verdon Public Schools. Falls City was to take about 33% of the students.

The district formerly used the "Second Step Curriculum", but after parental complaints, the curriculum was suspended in May 2022.

Schools
 Falls City High School
 Falls City Middle School
 Falls City North Elementary School
 Falls City South Elementary School

References

External links
 Falls City Public Schools
School districts in Nebraska
Education in Nemaha County, Nebraska
Education in Richardson County, Nebraska